The 2018–19 North Dakota Fighting Hawks men's basketball team represented the University of North Dakota during the 2018–19 NCAA Division I men's basketball season. The Fighting Hawks, led by 13th-year head coach Brian Jones, played their home games at the Betty Engelstad Sioux Center in Grand Forks, North Dakota as first-year members of the Summit League. They finished the season 12–18 overall, 6–10 in Summit League play, to finish in 7th place. In the Summit League tournament, they were defeated by Omaha in the quarterfinals.

On May 1, 2019, it was announced that head coach Brian Jones was stepping down, in order to take the associate head coaching position at Illinois State. On May 30, head coach of DII Northern State, Paul Sather, was announced as Jones' replacement.

Previous season
The Fighting Hawks finished the 2017–18 season 12–20, 6–12 in Big Sky play to finish in a tie for eighth place. They defeated Montana State in the first round of the Big Sky tournament before losing in the quarterfinals to Montana.

This season was the last for North Dakota as a full Big Sky member. On July 1, 2018, the school joined the Summit League in all sports except for football. The football team is playing the 2018 and 2019 seasons as an FCS independent, but will play a full Big Sky schedule in both seasons, after which it will join the Missouri Valley Football Conference.

Roster

Schedule and results

|-
!colspan=9 style=| Non-conference regular season

|-
!colspan=9 style=| Summit League regular season

|-
!colspan=9 style=| The Summit League tournament

Source:

References

North Dakota Fighting Hawks men's basketball seasons
North Dakota State
Fight
Fight